Cristo Rey St. Martin College Prep, formerly St. Martin de Porres High School, is a private high school in Waukegan, Illinois, established in 2004. It is a member of the Cristo Rey work-study network of high schools, and is in the Roman Catholic Archdiocese of Chicago.

History
In 2001 Auxiliary Bishop Gerald Kicanas and Rev. George J. Rassas, both of St. Mary's Catholic Church in Lake Forest, suggested opening a Cristo Rey school to enroll Hispanic and Latino and low income teenagers in the Waukegan/North Chicago area. St. Martin de Porres was the first Catholic high school to be established in Lake County since Carmel High School in Mundelein, which opened in 1963.

In 2018, the school moved into a former Kmart store that was extensively remodeled to become a school campus. The new building has won multiple awards for creatively reusing an existing space.

Background
The Cristo Rey Network comprises 35 high schools that provide a Catholic, college preparatory education to urban young people who live in communities with limited educational options. And 80% of the students at CRSM qualify for the Federal Free and Reduced Lunch Program. Students cover the bulk of their tuition by working at entry-level jobs in the corporate world. Around 86 businesses employ students from St. Martin's. Videos are available covering the St. Martin experience.

Cristo Rey St. Martin is open to students of all faiths and cultures. There are five school-wide liturgies, prayer services on Martin Luther King Day and Ash Wednesday, and a spiritual retreat program for all the students. Sixty-five percent of the students choose to participate in voluntary service projects.

Academics
Twenty-eight two-semester credits are required for graduation. This includes 4 credits in English and math, science, and social studies, 2 in world languages, and 1 in physical education/health. A credit in theology and in work study must also be earned for each year in attendance. Also 4 credits must be chosen from the choice of 9 advanced placement courses and about 11 other electives. Further, eligible students can earn college credit directly through College of Lake County. And Jesuit Virtual Learning Academy (JVLA) courses are available online for courses not offered at St. Martin.

References

External links
 School Website
 More than a Dream (official book site)
Cristo Rey Network
 Fr. John P. Foley honored with Presidential Citizen's Medal
60 minutes
Aljazeera
Cristo Rey Featured in WashPost column by George Will
 Boston Globe - With sense of purpose, students cut class for a day 
 Bill & Melinda Gates Foundation - Success of Innovative Urban Catholic School Sparks Major Investment

Cristo Rey Network
Educational institutions established in 2004
Roman Catholic Archdiocese of Chicago
Catholic secondary schools in Illinois
Waukegan, Illinois
Schools in Lake County, Illinois
2004 establishments in Illinois